Ms. Bear is a 1997 German-Canadian adventure film directed by Paul Ziller and starring Ed Begley Jr.

Plot

Cast
Ed Begley Jr. as Greg Bradley
Shaun Johnston as Barney Porter
Kaitlyn Burke as Emily Bradley
Natja Jamaan as Sara Bradley
Kimberley Warnat as Melissa Bradley
Dennis Arduini as Patrick Porter
Arthur Brauss as Schroeder
Devin Douglas Drewitz as Eldridge Porter

Sequel
The film spawned a sequel in 2000 titled Bear With Me.

References

External links
 
 

German adventure films
Canadian adventure films
English-language Canadian films
English-language German films
Films scored by Christopher Franke
Films directed by Paul Ziller
1990s English-language films
1990s Canadian films
1990s German films